Jennifer Fiori (23 March 1986 – 6 September 2021) was an Italian professional racing cyclist. She was killed in a traffic collison.

See also
 Top Girls Fassa Bortolo

References

External links
 

1986 births
2021 deaths
Italian female cyclists
Road incident deaths in Italy
People from Fabriano
Sportspeople from the Province of Ancona
Cyclists from Marche